The 2007 Women's Hockey Champions Trophy was the 15th edition of the Hockey Champions Trophy for women. It was held between 13–21 January 2007 in Quilmes, Argentina.

The Netherlands won the tournament for the fifth time after defeating Argentina 1–0 in the final.

Teams
Below are the teams qualified for the tournament, as listed by International Hockey Federation (FIH):
 (Defending champions and champions of 2004 Summer Olympics)
 (Champions of 2006 World Cup)
 (Host nation)
 (Second in 2006 World Cup)
 (Fourth in 2006 World Cup)
 (Fifth in 2006 World Cup)

Squads

Head Coach: Gabriel Minadeo

Head Coach: Frank Murray

Head Coach: Michael Behrmann

Head Coach: Yoo Seung-Jin

Head Coach: Marc Lammers

Head Coach: Pablo Usoz

Umpires
Below are the 8 umpires appointed by the International Hockey Federation:

Marelize de Klerk (RSA)
Carolina de la Fuente (ARG)
Miao Lin (CHN)
Monica Rivera (ESP)
Lisa Roach (AUS)
Chieko Soma (JPN)
Gina Spitaleri (ITA)
Wendy Stewart (CAN)

Results
All times are Argentina Time (UTC−03:00)

Pool

Classification

Fifth and sixth place

Third and fourth place

Final

Awards

Statistics

Final standings

Goalscorers

References

External links
Official FIH website

2007
2007 in women's field hockey
hockey
International women's field hockey competitions hosted by Argentina
Quilmes
January 2007 sports events in South America